Open-Site, the Open Encyclopedia Project was a free internet encyclopedia operated by Michael J. Flickinger in an effort to build a free categorized community-built encyclopedia, inspired by DMOZ. The Open Site software was open-source software under the Mozilla Public License and the content was free content under the GNU Free Documentation License.

The Open-Site encyclopedia used an ontology based on that of DMOZ.

Open-Site had the following main categories, under which most content was organized in several layers of subcategories:
Arts – covering creative pursuits and entertainment.
Business – covering business and finance.
Computers – covering computers and the internet.
Games – covering video games and various other games.
Health – covering human health and animal health.
Home – covering the home and family.
Recreation – covering recreation and leisure.
Regional – covering countries and localities.
Science – covering social sciences, mathematics and science.
Society – covering people and society.
Sports – covering various sports, including hockey, soccer and baseball.

In addition to these major topical English categories, the Open-Site encyclopedia also had the following other top-level categories.
International – contains the encyclopedia in several other languages.
News – updates on current events.
Kids – a children's internet encyclopedia in several languages.

The main page of Open Site stated: "Open-Site is edited by volunteer editors and its content is freely available for everyone under the GNU Free Documentation License."

The live pages and an RDF file were both available for public use, provided an appropriate notation of credit was provided. Open-Site listed nine websites that used its data.

In August 2004, the Open Site Foundation launched a children's encyclopedia based on the Open Site encyclopedia and the Kids and Teens section of DMOZ. It was formed by a group of editors from both projects. Open-Site Meta Editor and DMOZ KCatmv editor lufiaguy originated the idea.

The new encyclopedia aimed to provide mostly original content written specifically for children.

Open Site operated under a charter written by the founders of Open Site when it started in 2002. The key elements of the charter were:
Everyone has the right to apply to become an editor and to become involved in the project.
Everyone has the right to use Open Site data with few restrictions.
Everyone has the right to access and discuss policies and guidelines.
Everyone has the right to hold and express their own personal opinions in discussion.
The Open Site community will manage itself.
Everyone has the right to choose when and how they contribute to the project.
Everyone has the right to propose and submit content to the encyclopedia.

On October 2, 2007, Michael J. Flickinger released Open Site 2.0. The new version allowed the general public to apply for editing privileges at Open Site. The content was then reviewed by Open Site managers before being published.

In early June 2012, the encyclopedia was abandoned. and replaced with a listing of colleges and universities, promising to be a directory of open courseware.

See also 
 Lists of encyclopedias

References 

Online encyclopedias
Internet properties established in 2002
DMOZ
Defunct websites
21st-century encyclopedias